Michigan logging wheels are a type of skidder that was introduced in the 19th-century United States logging industry as a state-of-the-art technology for transporting lumber and timber over rough terrain. They proved most valuable in the winter months as they could extend the logging season since they were not dependent upon good seasonal weather conditions. It enabled a set of domestic labor animals (i.e. horses, mules, oxen) to transport many heavy logs of various sizes over a long distance of uneven wet ground.

Silas C. Overpack invented the Michigan logging wheels in 1875. They were all made individually upon order request at first, but mass-produced later when the concept was accepted nationwide. Cost was considered high and was dependent upon the diameter size requested by the customer. Logging companies bought dozens at a time to save labor costs.

History and use 

Michigan logging wheels were most commonly referred to as "high wheels." They were also known as big wheels, logging wheels, dragging wheels, lumber harvesting wheels, log bummer carts, and nibs. They were a type of nineteenth century horse-drawn log hauling vehicle using a method of dragging or skidding. They extended the timber extraction season for the logging industry in the North Woods of Michigan, by removing the need for frozen icy ground to traverse.

Silas C. Overpack first built Michigan logging wheels in 1875, at the request of a farmer who had found they were useful for logging over softer terrain.  At the time Michigan was the leading producer in the United States of felled trees that was used to manufacture lumber. He always painted his high wheels red. Overpack's logging wheels could haul logs without the need for icy ground. They did not sink into mud in the wet terrain of the northern woods where ordinary wagon wheels would get mired in the spring thaw. The wheels enabled a team of horses or labor animals to pull several logs at once.

Overpack was a wagon manufacturer in Manistee, Michigan, in 1875 that specialized making wooden wheels when he was asked to build a pair of unusually large  wagon wheels to a local farmer. This same farmer later returned asking Overpack to construct an even larger pair of wheels. When Overpack asked the farmer the purpose of such large wheels, he answered that he was attaching horses to them to drag logs of felled trees out of his muddy woods. From then on Overpack's big wheels were part of the Michigan logging history. Many northern states used them, and at least 65 different lumber companies in Michigan alone had them purchased by the dozens to save labor. In the nineteenth century, Michigan's rough and wet forest terrain restricted logging to the winter. Loggers used frozen ground to skid the logs from the woods to the railheads of railways or to river banks for further transport. In the spring they would slide the logs from the banking grounds into the rivers for the log drive to the sawmills. Overpack's production of Michigan logging wheels at his Manistee wagon business made logging possible year round.

When Overpack exhibited his Michigan logging wheels at the 1893 World's Columbian Exposition in Chicago, they were of much interest and caught on in the national timber industry for advancing commercial logging. They received a medal and a first premium award at this World's Fair. Overpack contracted with the Redding Iron Works Company as a vendor of his specialized wheels to help overcome shipping issues and aid in supplying his product to the western United States. The company's location on the West Coast made them ideal for the western United States timber industry. It later became a builder of Overpack's Michigan logging wheels. Overpack began manufacturing on a large scale and ultimately made thousands of logging wheels, selling them worldwide and shipping them via railroad to other states and Canada. The U.S. Army Forestry Department even took several to France during World War I. The logging wheels were discontinued by 1937.

Sizes

Unlike a wagon which carries a load above its axle, these huge wheels carried logs suspended by chains beneath the axle. The axles were made of hard maple, and the  tongues were ironwood. The wheels were clad with outer iron rims to protect them from stumps, fallen trees, and rocks, while interior iron rings reinforced the wooden spokes. Horses, oxen, or mules pulled them in the nineteenth century. In the early twentieth century tractors were used for the power source to pull them.

Locations containing logging wheels 
Loggers moved west when they had taken down most of the trees in New England. This was considered the states of Michigan, Wisconsin, and Minnesota. At the beginning of the 20th century Michigan determined they needed to conserve natural resources, including forests.
That then caused logging to move even further west.

The logging wheels can now be found as various museum pieces throughout the United States. 
Redding, California
Grayling, Michigan
Manistee, Michigan
Northern Arizona University
Hartwick Pines Logging Museum
Red Rock State Park, Sedona, Arizona
White Pine Village at Ludington, Michigan
Riordan Mansion State Historic Park, Flagstaff, AZ
University of Montana College of Forestry and Conservation

Gallery

See also 
Cart
Washington Winch

References

Sources 

 
 
 
 
 

Logging wheels
History of forestry in the United States
Logging in the United States
Carts
Forestry equipment
American inventions